Alissos is a village and a community in the municipal unit of Dymi, Achaea, Greece. It is located near the Gulf of Patras, 3 km east of Kato Achaia, 3 km southwest of Kaminia and 17 km southwest of Patras. The community consists of the villages Alissos, Kamenitsa, Paralia Alissou and Profitis Elissaios. The Greek National Road 9 (Patras - Pyrgos) and the railway from Patras to Pyrgos run between Alissos and Paralia Alissou.

History
Alissos was known as Lisarea or Lysaria during the period of Frankish rule in the late Middle Ages. According to the Chronicle of the Morea, it was a fief of the Barony of Akova, held in the late 1270s by Margaret of Lisarea (or Jeanne), a cousin of Walter of Rosières, baron of Akova. She married Geoffrey II of Briel. The fief was then inherited by their daughter, Helen, and her husband, Vilain II of Aulnay, Baron of Arcadia. Lisarea disappears thereafter, until ca. 1377, when it was held by Centurione I Zaccaria.

Historical population

See also
List of settlements in Achaea

References

Dymi, Achaea
Populated places in Achaea